Kubicek or Kubíček may refer to:

Kubicek Balloons, Czech manufacturer of hot-air balloons and airships
August Kubicek (1888–1956), close friend of Adolf Hitler
Jan Kubíček (1927–2013), Czech constructivist-concrete painter, sculptor and designer
Jan Nepomuk Kubíček (1801–1880), one of the great-grandfathers of the Brazilian president, Juscelino Kubitschek
Petr Kubíček (born 1957), Czechoslovak sprint canoer
Tomáš Kubíček (born 1962), Czech fencer

See also
 Kubicki, a surname
 Kubitschek (disambiguation)

Czech-language surnames